Bhardua is a village in Chandauli, Uttar Pradesh, India.

References

Villages in Chandauli district